Sir Eyre Hutson  (25 August 1864 – 14 September 1936) was an English colonial administrator who became Governor of British Honduras and later Governor of Fiji.

Hutson was born on 25 August 1864 and in 1885 entered the colonial service. After serving in Barbados, Mauritius, British Guiana and Jamaica he was appointed colonial secretary in Bermuda in July 1901. In 1908 he transferred to Fiji as colonial secretary and between 1915 and 1916 and again in 1919 he was Acting Governor of Fiji and Acting High Commissioner for the Western Pacific.

In 1918 he became the Governor of British Honduras until 1924 when he moved back to Fiji as governor. He retired from the colonial service in 1929. He died aged 72 at East Grinstead, Sussex on 14 September 1936 after a short illness.

References

1864 births
1936 deaths
Governors of British Honduras
Governors of Fiji
Members of the Legislative Council of Fiji
Knights Commander of the Order of St Michael and St George
High Commissioners for the Western Pacific
People from East Grinstead
Colonial Secretaries of Fiji
Colonial Secretaries of Bermuda